The 2015 WNBA season was the 8th season for the Atlanta Dream of the Women's National Basketball Association. This was the 2nd season under head coach Michael Cooper and the first season they have missed the playoffs since the 2008 season. The Dream opened their season up against the New York Liberty on June 5, 2022, with a 82–73 loss.

Transactions

WNBA Draft

Trades and Roster Changes

Roster
{| class="toccolours" style="font-size: 95%; width: 100%;"
|-
! colspan="2" style="background:#6495ED;color:white;"|2015 Atlanta Dream Roster
|- style="text-align:center; background-color:#FF0000; color:#FFFFFF;"
! Players !! Coaches
|- 
| valign="top" |
{| class="sortable" style="background:transparent; margin:0px; width:100%;"
! Pos. !! # !! Nat. !! Name !! Ht. !! Wt. !! From
|-

Depth

Schedule

Preseason

|- style="background:#fcc;"
		 | 1 
		 | May 23
		 | Washington
		 | L 55-79
		 | McCoughtryAlwal (10)
		 | Aneika Henry-Morello (9)
		 | Shoni Schimmel (6)
		 | KFC Yum! Center6,347
		 | 0–1
|- style="background:#cfc;"
		 | 2
		 | May 27
		 | @ New York
		 | W 85-72
		 | McCoughtryWheeler (13)
		 | Érika de Souza (10)
		 | Erica Wheeler (4)
		 | Madison Square Garden14,530
		 | 1–1

Regular season

|- style="background:#fcc;"
		 | 1 
		 | June 5
		 | @ New York
		 | L 73-82
		 | Angel McCoughtry (27)
		 | McCoughtrySchimmel (8)
		 | Shoni Schimmel (4)
		 | Madison Square Garden8,910
		 | 0–1
|- style="background:#fcc;"
		 | 2
		 | June 7
		 | Connecticut
		 | L 70-75
		 | Sancho Lyttle (16)
		 | Sancho Lyttle (14)
		 | Shoni Schimmel (3)
		 | Philips Arena8,350
		 | 0–2
|- style="background:#cfc;"
		 | 3
		 | June 11
		 | San Antonio
		 | W 72-69
		 | Angel McCoughtry (21)
		 | Sancho Lyttle (10)
		 | Shoni Schimmel (3)
		 | Philips Arena4,308
		 | 1–2
|- style="background:#cfc;"
		 | 4
		 | June 12
		 | @ Washington
		 | W 64-61
		 | Angel McCoughtry (21)
		 | Lyttlede Souza (6)
		 | SchimmelMcCoughtryAjavon (3)
		 | Philips Arena7,248
		 | 2–2
|- style="background:#fcc;"
		 | 5
		 | June 14
		 | @ Connecticut
		 | L 64-82
		 | Angel McCoughtry (24)
		 | Sancho Lyttle (10)
		 | LyttleWheeler (4)
		 | Mohegan Sun Arena5,520
		 | 2–3
|- style="background:#fcc;"
		 | 6
		 | June 16
		 | Indiana
		 | L 79-90
		 | Sancho Lyttle (19)
		 | Erika de Souza (9)
		 | McCoughtryde Souza (4)
		 | Philips Arena9,814
		 | 2–4
|- style="background:#cfc;"
		 | 7
		 | June 19
		 | Chicago
		 | W 74-73
		 | Angel McCoughtry (18)
		 | Erika de Souza (11)
		 | Angel McCoughtry (6)
		 | Philips Arena5,166
		 | 3–4
|- style="background:#fcc;"
		 | 8
		 | June 21
		 | New York
		 | L 64-73
		 | Angel McCoughtry (17)
		 | Erika de Souza (9)
		 | Angel McCoughtry (4)
		 | Philips Arena5,805
		 | 3–5
|- style="background:#fcc;"
		 | 9
		 | June 24
		 | @ Chicago
		 | L 96-100 OT
		 | Angel McCoughtry (34)
		 | LyttleMcCoughtry (10)
		 | McCoughtryAjavon (6)
		 | Allstate Arena9,893
		 | 3–6
|- style="background:#cfc;"
		 | 10
		 | June 26
		 | Washington
		 | W 72-69
		 | Angel McCoughtry (18)
		 | Sancho Lyttle (10)
		 | Matee Ajavon (4)
		 | Philips Arena5,861
		 | 4–6

|- style="background:#cfc;"
		 | 11
		 | July 5
		 | Seattle
		 | W 72-64
		 | Angel McCoughtry (23)
		 | Sancho Lyttle (15)
		 | McCoughtryHayes(4)
		 | Philips Arena5,385
		 | 5–6
|- style="background:#fcc;"
		 | 12
		 | July 7
		 | Tulsa
		 | L 75-85
		 | Angel McCoughtry (25)
		 | Sancho Lyttle (13)
		 | Matee Ajavon (4)
		 | Philips Arena6,744
		 | 5–7
|- style="background:#cfc;"
		 | 13
		 | July 12
		 | New York
		 | W 84-76
		 | Angel McCoughtry (32)
		 | Erika de Souza (8)
		 | Angel McCoughtry (6)
		 | Philips Arena6,028
         | 6–7
|- style="background:#fcc;"
		 | 14
		 | July 14
		 | @ Phoenix
		 | L 71-80
		 | Tiffany Hayes (19)
		 | Cierra Burdick (8)
		 | Cierra Burdick (6)
		 | US Airways Center10,472
		 | 6–8
|- style="background:#cfc;"
		 | 15
		 | July 16
		 | @ Los Angeles
		 | W 76-72
		 | Angel McCoughtry (22)
		 | Erika de Souza (8)
		 | McCoughtryWheeler (3)
		 | STAPLES Center12,567
		 | 7–8
|- style="background:#fcc;"
		 | 16
		 | July 18
		 | @ Seattle
		 | L 73-86
		 | Angel McCoughtry (16)
		 | de SouzaMilton-Jones (5)
		 | Shoni Schimmel (3)
		 | KeyArena9,686
		 | 7–9
|- style="background:#fcc;"
		 | 17
		 | July 21
		 | @ Chicago
		 | L 92-97
		 | Tiffany Hayes (19)
		 | Erika de Souza (9)
		 | Angel McCoughtry (6)
		 | Allstate Arena5,967
		 | 7–10
|- style="background:#fcc;"
		 | 18
		 | July 29
		 | @ San Antonio
		 | L 85-102
		 | Angel McCoughtry (14)
		 | Aneika Henry-Morello (9)
		 | Shoni Schimmel (7)
		 | Freeman Coliseum3,613
		 | 7–11
|- style="background:#fcc;"
		 | 19
		 | July 31
		 | @ Minnesota
		 | L 70-86
		 | Tiffany Hayes (15)
		 | Aneika Henry-Morello (8)
		 | Shoni Schimmel (10)
		 | Target Center9,134
		 | 7–12

|- style="background:#fcc;"
		 | 20
		 | August 2
		 | Phoenix
		 | L 68-71
		 | Angel McCoughtry (16)
		 | Henry-MorelloDantas (9)
		 | Roneeka Hodges (4)
		 | Philips Arena7,352
		 | 7–13
|- style="background:#fcc;"
		 | 21
		 | August 7
		 | @ Indiana
		 | L 77-106
		 | Angel McCoughtry (23)
		 | Aneika Henry-Morello (7)
		 | SchimmelMcCoughtry (3)
		 | Bankers Life Fieldhouse7,869
		 | 7–14
|- style="background:#cfc;"
		 | 22
		 | August 9
		 | @ Tulsa
		 | W 98-90
		 | Angel McCoughtry (23)
		 | Angel McCoughtry (9)
		 | HayesMcCoughtry (4)
		 | BOK Center5,345
		 | 8–14
|- style="background:#fcc;"
		 | 23
		 | August 14
		 | Minnesota
		 | L 82-84
		 | Angel McCoughtry (32)
		 | DantasGray (8)
		 | Shoni Schimmel (8)
		 | Philips Arena5,890
		 | 8–15
|- style="background:#cfc;"
		 | 24
		 | August 16
		 | Connecticut
		 | W 90-77
		 | McCoughtryGray (18)
		 | Sancho Lyttle (7)
		 | Matee Ajavon (7)
		 | Philips Arena5,661
		 | 9–15
|- style="background:#fcc;"
		 | 25
		 | August 21
		 | @ New York
		 | L 67-78
		 | Tiffany Hayes (17)
		 | Sancho Lyttle (8)
		 | Shoni Schimmel (4)
		 | Madison Square Garden9,303
		 | 9–16
|- style="background:#cfc;"
		 | 26
		 | August 23
		 | @ Connecticut
		 | W 102-92
		 | Angel McCoughtry (33)
		 | Angel McCoughtry (8)
		 | Matee Ajavon (8)
		 | Mohegan Sun Arena5,319
		 | 10–16
|- style="background:#cfc;"
		 | 27
		 | August 25
		 | Connecticut
		 | W 71-57
		 | Sancho Lyttle (17)
		 | HayesHenry-Morello (9)
		 | AjavonHayes (5)
		 | Philips Arena5,573
		 | 11–16
|- style="background:#cfc;"
		 | 28
		 | August 28
		 | @ Indiana
		 | W 90-84
		 | Tiffany Hayes (28)
		 | Sancho Lyttle (8)
		 | AjavonSchimmelMcCoughtry (2)
		 | Bankers Life Fieldhouse7,303
		 | 12–16
|- style="background:#fcc;"
		 | 29
		 | August 29
		 | Chicago
		 | L 98-96
		 | Angel McCoughtry (33)
		 | Angel McCoughtry (11)
		 | Sancho Lyttle (3)
		 | Philips Arena6,872
		 | 12–17

|- style="background:#fcc;"
		 | 30
		 | September 1
		 | @ New York
		 | L 75-80 OT
		 | Angel McCoughtry (25)
		 | Aneika Henry-Morello (9)
		 | Tiffany Hayes (6)
		 | Madison Square Garden7,482
		 | 12–18
|- style="background:#cfc;"
		 | 31
		 | September 6
		 | @ Washington
		 | W 73-67
		 | Tiffany Hayes (19)
		 | Aneika Henry-MorelloLyttle (10)
		 | Sancho Lyttle (6)
		 | Philips Arena5,584
		 | 13–18
|- style="background:#cfc;"
		 | 32
		 | September 9
		 | Los Angeles
		 | W 90-60
		 | Angel McCoughtry (23)
		 | Damiris Dantas (12)
		 | SchimmelHayesAjavon (5)
		 | Philips Arena3,856
		 | 14–18
|- style="background:#fcc;"
		 | 33
		 | September 11
		 | Indiana
		 | L 67-75
		 | Sancho Lyttle (19)
		 | LyttleAneika Henry-Morello (8)
		 | HayesLyttle (3)
		 | Philips Arena5,823
		 | 14–19
|- style="background:#cfc;"
		 | 34
		 | September 13
		 | @ Washington
		 | W 73-71
		 | Angel McCoughtry (24)
		 | Sancho Lyttle (12)
		 | SchimmelLyttle (3)
		 | Verizon Center7,196
		 | 15–19

Standings

Statistics

Regular season

Awards and Honors

References

External links
THE OFFICIAL SITE OF THE ATLANTA DREAM
Atlanta Dream 2015 Schedule - Dream Home and Away - ESPN

Atlanta Dream seasons
Atlanta
Atlanta Dream